{{DISPLAYTITLE:C5H6O2}}
The molecular formula C5H6O2 (molar mass: 98.10 g/mol) may refer to:

 Ethyl propiolate
 Furfuryl alcohol
 Glutaconaldehyde
 Tulipalin A
 1,2-Cyclopentanedione
 1,3-Cyclopentanedione